Minuria leptophylla commonly known as minnie daisy, is a flowering plant in the family Asteraceae. It is a small perennial herb with white daisy-like flowers. It is endemic to Australia and grows in all mainland states.

Description
The stems are sparsely, minutely hairy eventually becoming smooth.

Taxonomy and naming
Minuria leptophylla was first formally described in 1836 by  Augustin Pyramus de Candolle and the description was published in Prodromus Systematis Naturalis Regni Vegetabilis.The specific epithet (leptophylla) means "leaved ".

Distribution and habitat
Minnie daisy grows in all mainland states of Australia on loam or light clay soils in woodland, forest and shrubland.

References

Astereae
Asterales of Australia